Jacob Martin Myers (October 25, 1904 – September 15, 1991) was a Bible commentator and senior lecturer in the department of Hebrew and Old Testament at the Lutheran Theological Seminary at Gettysburg, Pennsylvania. In 1930 he was ordained a pastor by the West Pennsylvania Synod of the United Lutheran Church in America.

Myers was born on October 25, 1904 in West Manchester, Pennsylvania to Harvey A. Myers and his wife Annie (née Seiffert).

His academic education started at Gettysburg Seminary followed by the Temple University in Philadelphia. His PhD work was done at Johns Hopkins University in Semitics and completed in 1946. Whilst at Johns Hopkins  he came under the profound influence of Professor W. F. Albright.

Selected works

Books

Articles & chapters

References

External links
Festschrift profile for Myers

1904 births
1991 deaths
Bible commentators
People from York County, Pennsylvania
American biblical scholars
Old Testament scholars
Temple University alumni
Johns Hopkins University alumni
Lutheran Theological Seminary at Philadelphia alumni
20th-century American Lutheran clergy

Lutheran biblical scholars